The 1931 Fresno State Bulldogs football team represented Fresno State Normal School—now known as California State University, Fresno—during the 1931 college football season.

Fresno State competed in the Far Western Conference (FWC). The 1931 team was led by third-year head coach Stanley Borleske and played home games at Fresno State College Stadium on the campus of Fresno City College in Fresno, California. They finished the season with a record of four wins and six losses (4–6, 3–2 FWC). The Bulldogs were outscored by their opponents 98–123 for the season.

Schedule

Notes

References

Fresno State
Fresno State Bulldogs football seasons
Fresno State Bulldogs football